Bulan–Magallanes Road is a , national secondary road in Sorsogon province of the Philippines.

The entire road is designated as National Route 645 (N645) of the Philippine highway network.

Route description
The road starts from the junction of Maharlika Highway in Irosin–Matnog boundary as its eastern terminus, where the road officially known as the Gate–Bulan Airport Road by DPWH. It provides access to the town proper of Bulan. Within the town proper, the route continues at the T-junction to the right, where the eastern terminus of Bulan Seaport Road (N646) is located to the left that connects to Bulan Seaport. Currently, the numbered route ends at the Bulan Airport. The rest of the route remained unnumbered and rest of the road to Magallanes is not yet classified as a tertiary national road by DPWH.

Intersections

References

Roads in Sorsogon